The 1905 Yale Bulldogs football team was an American football that represented Yale University as an independent during the 1905 college football season. The team finished with a 10–0 record, shut out nine of ten opponents, and outscored all opponents by a total of 227 to 4. Jack Owsley was the head coach, and Tom Shevlin was the team captain.

There was no contemporaneous system in 1905 for determining a national champion. However, Yale was retroactively named as the national champion by Caspar Whitney and Parke H. Davis.

Four Yale players were selected as consensus first-team players on the 1905 All-America team. The team's consensus All-Americans were: quarterback Guy Hutchinson, halfback Howard Roome, end Tom Shevlin, and guard Roswell Tripp. Other key players included halfback Samuel F. B. Morse and tackles Robert Forbes and Lucius Horatio Biglow.

Schedule

References

Yale
Yale Bulldogs football seasons
College football national champions
College football undefeated seasons
Yale Bulldogs football